The Svitávka is a river in Liberec Region (Czech Republic) and Saxony (Germany). It is a right tributary of the Ploučnice, which it joins near Zákupy. Its source is in the Zittau Mountains, near Jonsdorf. After about  it crosses the Czech border and flows further south, through Mařenice, Kunratice u Cvikova, Velenice and Zákupy.

See also
List of rivers of the Czech Republic
List of rivers of Saxony

Rivers of Saxony
Rivers of the Liberec Region
Rivers of Germany
International rivers of Europe